Lake Hayes Estate (often shortened to LHE) is a town nearby to Queenstown in the South Island of New Zealand.
It is named after and situated near Lake Hayes; however, the lake is not visible from most parts of the estate.
The main access to Lake Hayes Estate is off . To the west is the newer sub division of Shotover Country which can be accessed via Jones Road.

Lake Hayes Estate was one of the first residential areas of a large scale involving quite flat land near Queenstown, meaning sections were quite sought after. The original 700 sections have virtually all been built on. In 2012 work began on a sub division bordering Lake Hayes Estate called Hayes Creek and by 2016 all of these sections had been sold.

History 
For a long time, the area was known as Douglasvale but once residential development began around 1990 by Lake Hayes Estate Ltd it was officially given its current name.

Demographics
Statistics New Zealand describes Lake Hayes as a small urban area comprising Shotover Country, Lake Hayes Estate and Lake Hayes statistical area.

Lake Hayes Estate

Lake Hayes Estate had a population of 2,139 at the 2018 New Zealand census, an increase of 540 people (33.8%) since the 2013 census, and an increase of 1,569 people (275.3%) since the 2006 census. There were 585 households. There were 1,077 males and 1,062 females, giving a sex ratio of 1.01 males per female. The median age was 32.4 years (compared with 37.4 years nationally), with 573 people (26.8%) aged under 15 years, 417 (19.5%) aged 15 to 29, 1,071 (50.1%) aged 30 to 64, and 78 (3.6%) aged 65 or older.

Ethnicities were 82.9% European/Pākehā, 6.6% Māori, 1.7% Pacific peoples, 12.3% Asian, and 4.8% other ethnicities (totals add to more than 100% since people could identify with multiple ethnicities).

The proportion of people born overseas was 32.0%, compared with 27.1% nationally.

Although some people objected to giving their religion, 63.7% had no religion, 26.6% were Christian, 1.8% were Hindu, 0.7% were Muslim, 0.8% were Buddhist and 2.4% had other religions.

Of those at least 15 years old, 411 (26.2%) people had a bachelor or higher degree, and 126 (8.0%) people had no formal qualifications. The median income was $45,200, compared with $31,800 nationally. 399 people (25.5%) earned over $70,000 compared to 17.2% nationally. The employment status of those at least 15 was that 1,089 (69.5%) people were employed full-time, 255 (16.3%) were part-time, and 24 (1.5%) were unemployed.

Lake Hayes

Lake Hayes had a population of 354 at the 2018 New Zealand census, an increase of 36 people (11.3%) since the 2013 census, and an increase of 102 people (40.5%) since the 2006 census. There were 132 households. There were 180 males and 174 females, giving a sex ratio of 1.03 males per female. The median age was 49.0 years (compared with 37.4 years nationally), with 57 people (16.1%) aged under 15 years, 36 (10.2%) aged 15 to 29, 198 (55.9%) aged 30 to 64, and 63 (17.8%) aged 65 or older.

Ethnicities were 93.2% European/Pākehā, 5.9% Māori, 2.5% Asian, and 1.7% other ethnicities (totals add to more than 100% since people could identify with multiple ethnicities).

The proportion of people born overseas was 23.7%, compared with 27.1% nationally.

Although some people objected to giving their religion, 51.7% had no religion, 44.1% were Christian and 2.5% had other religions.

Of those at least 15 years old, 99 (33.3%) people had a bachelor or higher degree, and 15 (5.1%) people had no formal qualifications. The median income was $52,400, compared with $31,800 nationally. 111 people (37.4%) earned over $70,000 compared to 17.2% nationally. The employment status of those at least 15 was that 156 (52.5%) people were employed full-time, 45 (15.2%) were part-time, and 3 (1.0%) were unemployed.

Shops and Affordable Housing 
Nerin Square is a large roundabout situated in the centre of the estate.

In 2014 the first shops appeared in Lake Hayes Estate within Nerin Square which consisted of a restaurant, bar and general store.

A large affordable housing development called Nerin Square is next to McBride Park. It was set up by the Queenstown Lakes Community Housing Trust to help locals into their own homes due to the general affordability of housing in the Queenstown region. Nerin Square was the first major development for the trust, which built 27 homes in the centre of Lake Hayes Estate.

McBride Park 
McBride Park is one of the central points of the estate and was named after a family of industrious settlers who first lived on the land.
In the centre of the estate is a large grassed park which is surrounded by a bike park and bike pump track made of asphalt.
There is a mini multi-purpose turf near Onslow Road which is used for basketball, hockey, tennis and football.
There is also a large children's playground next to Hope Avenue which includes a variety of activities available including a flying fox and a climbing rock. There is also a public barbecue incorporated with the playground.

Public Tracks 
There are a large number of public trails that circle the estate and allow good access throughout the suburb. They are used by walkers, runners and cyclists and connect to the much larger Queenstown Trail. The Lake Hayes Circuit track connects with Lake Hayes to the north via Ada Place. The Twin Rivers Ride to the south connects to Frankton and Gibbston and is accessed via Widgeon Place. The nearby subdivision of Shotover Country to the west can is linked via the trail network to Lake Hayes Estate.

References

External links 
 The Lake Hayes Loop biking, running and walking trail, part of the Queenstown Trail
 The Twin Rivers Ride biking, running and walking trail, part of the Queenstown Trail
 Queenstown Lakes Community Housing Trust

Suburbs of Queenstown, New Zealand
Populated places in Otago